Glyphostoma polynesiensis is a species of sea snail, a marine gastropod mollusk in the family Clathurellidae.

Description
The whorls are narrowly obtusely shouldered, longitudinally closely ribbed, transversely striated. The outer lip is thickened. The anal sinus is large. The color of the shell is white.

Distribution
This marine species occurs along Lord Hood Island in Western Australia.

References

polynesiensis
Gastropods described in 1845